Alkyl sulfonates are esters of alkane sulfonic acids with the general formula R-SO2-O-R'. They act as alkylating agents, some of them are used as alkylating antineoplastic agents in the treatment of cancer, e.g. Busulfan.

References

Sulfonate esters